Matee Joseph Molefe is a South African sailor, currently serving as Master at Arms of the South African Navy, the highest enlisted post in the Navy.

Malefe was part of the ANC’s armed wing, Umkhonto we Sizwe before being integrated into the Navy in 1994. He was appointed Fleet Master at Arms in 2016 and promoted to Master at Arms of the Navy on 1 February 2018.

References

South African Navy personnel